Historical library may refer to:

 Bibliotheca historica, a work of universal history by Diodorus Siculus
 Bentley Historical Library
 Clarke Historical Library
 Seeley Historical Library
 Illinois State Historical Library, housed in the Abraham Lincoln Presidential Library and Museum
 Naval Historical Library, managed by the Naval Historical Branch